Micheal Ray Bergstrom (born September 30, 1957) is a Republican member of the Oklahoma State Senate, representing the 1st district. He was initially elected in November 2016.

Bergstrom sponsored legislation to prohibit nonbinary gender markers on birth certificates. Bergstrom argued, "It’s not a complicated issue — biologically, you’re either a male or female. There should be no other option to choose from on a birth certificate." According to the American Medical Association, "empirical evidence has demonstrated that trans and nonbinary gender identities are normal variations of human identity and expression." It was signed into law by Oklahoma governor Kevin Stitt in 2022. He also authored another bill Stitt signed into law the same year banning transgender women athletes from competing in women's sports.

References

1957 births
21st-century American politicians
Living people
Republican Party Oklahoma state senators